Salem Township is one of the twelve townships of Meigs County, Ohio, United States.  The 2000 census found 944 people in the township.

Geography
Located in the southwestern corner of the county, it borders the following townships:
Columbia Township - north
Scipio Township - northeast corner
Rutland Township - east
Cheshire Township, Gallia County - southeast corner
Morgan Township, Gallia County - south
Huntington Township, Gallia County - southwest
Wilkesville Township, Vinton County - west
Vinton Township, Vinton County - northwest corner

No municipalities are located in Salem Township.

Name and history
It is one of fourteen Salem Townships statewide.

Government
The township is governed by a three-member board of trustees, who are elected in November of odd-numbered years to a four-year term beginning on the following January 1. Two are elected in the year after the presidential election and one is elected in the year before it. There is also an elected township fiscal officer, who serves a four-year term beginning on April 1 of the year after the election, which is held in November of the year before the presidential election. Vacancies in the fiscal officership or on the board of trustees are filled by the remaining trustees.

References

External links
County website

Townships in Meigs County, Ohio
Townships in Ohio